Hsiung Kang Sin Yi Art Museum is a 33-story,  tall residential skyscraper located in Gushan District, Kaohsiung, Taiwan. Construction of the skyscraper began in 2012 and it was completed in 2018, under strict requirements of preventing damage caused by earthquakes and typhoons common in the country.

See also 
 List of tallest buildings in Taiwan
 List of tallest buildings in Kaohsiung

References

2018 establishments in Taiwan
Residential skyscrapers in Taiwan
Skyscrapers in Kaohsiung
Apartment buildings in Taiwan
Residential buildings completed in 2018
Neoclassical architecture in Taiwan